St. Peter's Church, known as the Latin Church or the Saxon Church (Сашка црква), is an old Roman Catholic church built in the 13th century, near Mitrovica in Kosovo. It was a Protected Monument of Culture of the Republic of Serbia from 1958, and is protected as a Cultural Heritage by the Republic of Kosovo.

The church was built by Saxon miners and Catholic merchants from the maritime cities during the medieval Kingdom of Serbia. Intended to serve the Catholic community needs, it was firstly mentioned in 1303, in conjunction with the town of Trepça. In the 21st century the church is almost entirely in ruins and only the old part of the perimeter walls remains. The only wall standing is the main part of eastern wall, with three apses. The building is of the basilica type, while the shape and construction of the walls is indicative of Byzantine influence.

See also

Monuments in Mitrovica
Stari Trg mine

Notes

References

Sources
 

Roman Catholic churches in Kosovo
Churches in Mitrovica, Kosovo
Basilica churches in Europe
13th-century Roman Catholic church buildings
Protected Monuments of Culture
Cultural heritage monuments in Mitrovica, Kosovo
Cultural heritage monuments in Kosovska Mitrovica District